Gravitas was one of the Ancient Roman virtues.

Gravitas may also refer to: 
 Gravitas (news), from WION (TV channel)
 Gravitas (Talib Kweli album)
 Gravitas (Asia album)
 Gravitas Recordings